The Selmer Mark VI is a saxophone produced from 1954 to 1981. Production shifted to the Mark VII for the tenor and alto in the mid-1970s (see discussion of serial numbers below), and to the Super Action 80 for the soprano and baritone saxophones in 1981. The sopranino saw limited production until about 1985.

Selmer debuted the Mark VI in 1954 with sopranino, soprano, alto, tenor, baritone and bass saxophones, until the introduction of the Mark VII model in 1975.  Since the Mark VI design continued for sopraninos, sopranos, baritones, or bass saxes, they did not have a Mark VII model. There are reports of a limited number of baritone saxophones labeled as Mark VIIs, but these horns were of the same design as the Mark VI.

All Mark VI saxophones were manufactured in France. After manufacture, instruments designated for the British/Canadian or American markets were shipped unassembled and unengraved to their respective markets for completion. The style of engraving on the bell of the instrument is an indicator of the place of assembly.

The French-assembled Mark VI engraving is usually of a butterfly and floral motif, and the engraving typically extends to the bow. Some French-assembled Mark VIs lack any engraving other than the brand stamp. Nickel or silver-plated keys with a lacquer-finish body were offered among the French-assembled horns.

The British/Canadian Mark VIs often have a symmetrical medallion engraved on the front of the bell, and a design reminiscent of the chambered nautilus along the sides of the bell.

American-assembled Mark VIs have floral or scroll engraving, with only the earliest models extending to the bow. The Mark VI is played by many saxophonists including Jimmy Heath, Sonny Rollins, John Coltrane, Maceo Parker, and David Sanborn.

The design of the Mark VI evolved over time. Switching over from its predecessor, officially named the Super Action but commonly called the Super Balanced Action, Selmer's earliest Mark VI models were transitional, incorporating design elements from the preceding model. Tonally, early examples are considered to have a "dark" tone, while later examples are thought of as having a "bright" sound. The bore taper, bow, neck designs, and some mechanical features changed throughout the history of the Mark VI. The changes were not documented by Selmer.  The length of the bow was increased on altos during the 85K serial number range to address certain intonation issues. In subsequent years the short bow was reintroduced. Some altos had baffles soldered into the bow to correct intonation issues.  At least three changes to neck design were made on the tenor during the 1950s and 1960s, and once again in the 1970s. Some contend that the neck design changes account for the different tonal and playing qualities between earlier and later Mark VIs. Others contend that Mark VIs produced after about SN 180,000 had harder metal as a result of a change in the metalworking process, however, that SN corresponds to a known change in neck design so differing characteristics before and after can not definitely be ascribed to metallurgy.

Latter-year Mark VIs gained a reputation of being lower quality than early versions (possibly due to Selmer's higher annual production output of the popular saxophone), leading to a greater demand of early-year Mark VIs with a five-digit serial number.  An employee's description of the assembly and quality control process at Selmer USA during the 1960s indicated that different quality Mark VIs were sold through different channels; the top tier was offered to musicians under contract to Selmer ("Selmer Artists"), the second tier went to pro dealers in major markets, and the third tier went to the general market. Hence, the best assurance of the quality of a Mark VI may be its sale history, as more variability could be expected in the quality of horns initially sold in the general market.

The high F key was offered as an option, though some players believe that instruments without the high F key have better natural intonation. During the mid-1960s optional keywork was offered, including the rare 'Concert' model with a high F#, right hand G#, D to E flat trill key and C to D trill key using the E flat palm key. There are also somewhat rare low A alto and baritone models. The low A baritone is especially sought after, whereas the low A alto model acquired a reputation, rightly or wrongly, for intonation issues. Nonetheless, Ornette Coleman played a low A alto.

The quality and ergonomics of the keywork design of the Mark VI can be observed in current saxophone designs: most modern saxophones have keywork that is based upon the basic Mark VI design.

Selmer's General Manager Jerome Selmer has confirmed that all Mark VIs were manufactured from industry-standard 66/34 "yellow brass" stock and that Selmer never recycled shell casings.

Years of production by serial number
 1954- 55201-59000
 1955- 59001-63400
 1956- 63401-68900
 1957- 68901-74500
 1958- 74501-80400
 1959- 80401-85200
 1960- 85201-91300
 1961- 91301-97300
 1962- 97301-104500
 1963- 104501-112500
 1964- 112501-121600
 1965- 121601-131800
 1966- 131801-141500
 1967- 141501-152400
 1968- 152401-162500
 1969- 162501-173800
 1970- 173801-184900
 1971- 184901-196000
 1972- 196001-208700
 1973- 208701-220800
 1974- (After 231,000/Mark VII) 220801-233900

The "Official" Serial number guide issued by Selmer was not exact and Selmer never meant for it to be so. There can be as much as an 18-month (+/-) variation in actual production dates. This has been verified by original owners with receipts of their instruments showing purchase dates earlier than they would have been produced according to this chart. An example exists of an 89,000 series instrument sold in 1959. The actual timing of the transition from Mark VI to Mark VII altos and tenors is unclear--Mark VIs exist in the 236,000 (1975) serial number range, contrary to the purported 231,000 Mark VII change-over. One hypothesis is that the announcement of the transition in Selmer's 1974 literature was premature. Another is that Selmer produced both the Mark VI design and early Mark VII horns concurrently, or possibly until the existing parts for the Mark VI were used up. Reported early Mark VII examples have Mark VII keywork on Mark VI type body tubes.

The Mark VI Soprano, Baritone, and  Bass models were produced from 1954-1981.  It is possible to find confirmed examples of these instruments in the serial range of # 55201-365000.  The Mark VI Sopranino model was produced from 1954-1985 and can be found within the serial number range of # 55201-378000.
The Mark VI was succeeded by the Mark VII, which was produced as alto and tenor saxophones only.

References

External links
 An independent review of the Selmer Mk VI alto sax
 Saxpics: Selmer Mark VI
 The largest South American collection of Mark VI is on - MegaMusic® do Brasil

1954 musical instruments
Saxophones